Annick Vaxelaire-Pierrel (born 19 July 1974) is a French cross-country skier. She competed at the 1998 Winter Olympics and the 2002 Winter Olympics.

Cross-country skiing results
All results are sourced from the International Ski Federation (FIS).

Olympic Games

World Championships

a.  Cancelled due to extremely cold weather.

World Cup

Season standings

Team podiums
 1 podium – (1 )

References

External links
 

1974 births
Living people
French female cross-country skiers
Olympic cross-country skiers of France
Cross-country skiers at the 1998 Winter Olympics
Cross-country skiers at the 2002 Winter Olympics
People from Remiremont
Sportspeople from Vosges (department)
21st-century French women